Ghosta (also spelled Ghusta) is a municipality in the Keserwan District of the Keserwan-Jbeil Governorate of Lebanon. It is located 36 kilometers north of Beirut. Ghosta's average elevation is 950 meters above sea level and its total land area is 461 hectares. Its inhabitants are predominantly Maronite Catholics.

History
Ottoman tax records indicate Ghosta had 11 Christian households in 1523, 12 Christian households and one bachelor in 1530, and 15 Christian households and one bachelor in 1543.

In 1838, Eli Smith noted  Ghusta as a village located in Aklim el-Kesrawan, Northeast of Beirut; the chief seat of the Maronites.

Ghosta has three schools, two private and one public, with a total of 772 students as of 2008. As of 2008, there were eleven companies with at least five employees operating in the village. It is home to the Congregation of Maronite Lebanese Missionaries and its main monastery, and the birthplace of Lebanese pioneer painter, Daoud Corm (1852 – 1930) and of pioneer Lebanese journalist, Philippe Ziade (1909–2005).

See also
Batha, Lebanon
List of cities and towns in Lebanon
List of municipalities of Lebanon

References

Bibliography

 

Populated places in Keserwan District
Maronite Christian communities in Lebanon